Tod's S.p.A., also known as Tod's Group, is an Italian company which produces luxury shoes and other leather goods. The company is majority controlled by the founding family Della Valle Family and is listed on the Italy's Milan Stock Exchange being part of the FTSE Italia Mid Cap index. It is presided over by businessman Diego Della Valle.

History
Filippo Della Valle started the shoemaking business out of a basement in the late 1920s. Diego Della Valle, the elder son of Dorino Della Valle and a grandson of Filippo Della Valle, expanded the workshop and turned it into a factory that started manufacturing shoes for American department stores in the 1970s. Mr. Della Valle says he became interested in the retailer on his first visit to the United States as a youth, when he stopped in at a Saks Fifth Avenue store, to which his father used to sell shoes.

Diego brought in innovative marketing strategies in the early 1980s, kept the handmade manufacturing process and went on to create brands of lifestyle named Tod's, Hogan and Fay. Roger Vivier, maker of high luxury shoes, was acquired in the mid-1990s and developed starting in 2000. In 2003, Italian designer Bruno Frisoni was hired as Roger Vivier's Creative Director.

The Della Valle family, which owns the luxury maker, also has stakes in RCS MediaGroup, the football team Fiorentina and other companies. All members of the family were born in the middle Italian region of Marche, and many of them continue to reside there.

Tod's has numerous stores around the world, including large flagship stores in Europe, the U.S., China, Japan, Malaysia, Singapore, Hong Kong, Indonesia, and Australia.

Recent development
In 2008, Tod’s licensed its name and branding to Marcolin Group for optical frames and sunglasses and in 2018 extended its licensing agreement through 2023.

In November 2015, Tod's acquired further stock in the Roger Vivier shoe brand for €415 million. It had previously owned a 57.5% stake, now up to 60.7%. In April 2021, they got Italian influencer Chiara Ferragni to join their board. In May 2021, the market value of Tod's was €1.6 billion. In early 2021, LVMH raised its investment in the group from 3.2% to 10% for $89,9 million.

See also 
 Italian fashion

References

External links
 

Shoe brands
Luxury brands
Shoe companies of Italy
Companies based in le Marche
Italian brands
Della Valle family
High fashion brands